The Big Hurt is a 1986 low-budget thriller directed by Barry Peak starring David Bradshaw, Lian Lunson, Simon Chilvers, John Ewart, Alan Cassell.

It was shot over six weeks with money raised via 10BA. It was filmed on Super 16mm but later blown up to 35mm.

References

External links
 
 The Big Hurt at Oz Movies

1986 thriller films
1986 films
Films shot in 16 mm film
1980s English-language films